The Constitution of the Year XII, also called the Organic Sénatus-consulte of 28 Floréal, year XII, was a national constitution of the First French Republic adopted during the Year XII of the French Revolutionary Calendar (1804 in the Gregorian calendar).

It amended the earlier Constitution of the Year VIII and Constitution of the Year X, establishing the First French Empire with Napoleon Bonaparte — previously First Consul for Life, with wide-ranging powers — as Napoleon I, Emperor of the French. The Constitution established the House of Bonaparte as France's imperial dynasty, making the throne hereditary in Napoleon's family. The Constitution of the Year XII was later itself extensively amended by the Additional Act and definitively abolished with the final return of the Bourbons in 1815.

Timeline of French constitutions

See also
1804 French constitutional referendum

External links
  Text of the Constitution of the Year XII

Defunct constitutions
Constitutions of France
1804 in France
Legal history of France
1804 documents
First French Empire